Harania Creek is the name of the shallow estuarine waterway in the Māngere Inlet on the Manukau Harbour, Auckland, New Zealand.

The waterway system is fed by a number of small open and piped creeks which bring runoff from residential, industrial and park areas in Otahuhu, Māngere East, and Favona. The largest of these fresh water runoffs is the Māngere East catchment which emerges from behind the Pacific Steel reclamation.

The creek is bound by mangroves in its upper reaches. These mangroves emerged from approximately 1970s onwards, following the end of significant emissions from several large slaughterhouses. The mangrove roots create a tight course for the creek, which has deepened over time.

The area has been the subject of study into the geomorphology of fresh water flowing through a tidal system by the Auckland University Geology Department. This looked at changing sea levels over time.

The Norana Esplanade Walkway opened in 2020 and crosses the Harania Creek estuary and its associated mangroves.

References

Geography of Auckland
Rivers of the Auckland Region
Māngere-Ōtāhuhu Local Board Area
Manukau Harbour catchment